Democratic Front is the name of opposition faction in Parliament of Georgia. Democratic Front is coalition of the Republican Party of Georgia, the Conservative Party of Georgia and some non-party MPs. Democratic Front is chaired by David Zurabishvili, former member of Liberty Institute.
Political party alliances in Georgia (country)